Ahmadis are members of the Ahmadiyya Muslim Community.

Ahmadi may also refer to

Places

Iran
 Ahmadi, Bushehr
 Ahmadi, East Azerbaijan
 Ahmadi, Hamadan
 Ahmadi, Hormozgan
 Ahmadi, Hajjiabad, Hormozgan Province
 Ahmadi District, in Hormozgan Province
 Ahmadi Rural District, in Hormozgan Province
 Ahmadi, Kuhbanan, Kerman Province
 Ahmadi, Rafsanjan, Kerman Province
 Ahmadi, Zarand, Kerman Province
 Ahmadi, Khuzestan

Elsewhere
 Amadiya, an ancient hilltop city in Iraq
 Al Ahmadi, Kuwait, a city in Kuwait
 Al-Ahmadiyah, former Syrian village in the Golan

Other uses
 Ahmadi (surname)